Club Sportiv Vedița Colonești M.S., commonly known as Vedița Colonești or simply as Vedița, is a Romanian professional football club based in Colonești, Olt County. The team currently plays in the Liga III.

History
Vedița Colonești was originally founded in 1982 and play all its existence at amateur level.

Atletic Bradu (2008–2019)
Atletic Bradu was founded in 2008 and was based in Bradu, Argeș County, having a kit color combination of white and green. Atletic played in the Liga IV–Argeș County until 2010 when the club won the league and promoted to Liga III. The best performance was 2nd place at the end of the 2016–17 Liga III season.

During the 2018–19 winter break, following some misunderstandings with local authorities of Bradu, Atletic moved from Argeș County to Colonești, Olt County. In Colonești, the owner of the team reached an agreement with the local authorities, so that in the summer of 2019 Atletic will merge with the local team, Vedița Colonești, changing its name and colors.

Vedița Colonești (2019–present)
In the summer of 2019, it was announced officially that Atletic Bradu merged with Vedița Colonești. After this move, Vedița Colonești took Atletic Bradu place in the Liga III, then absorbed the team based in Argeș County.

Honours

Domestic

Leagues
Liga III
Winners (1): 2020–21
Runners-up (1): 2016–17

Liga IV – Argeș County
Winners (2): 2009–10, 2012–13

Players

First team squad

Out on loan

Club officials

Board of directors

Current technical staff

League history

References

External links
 FRF-AJF Profile

Association football clubs established in 2008
Football clubs in Olt County
Liga III clubs
Liga IV clubs
2008 establishments in Romania